Joseph Brooks (November 1, 1821 – April 30, 1877) was a Methodist minister, newspaper editor, and politician who served as the 19th postmaster of Little Rock, Arkansas, from 1875 to 1877. During the Reconstruction Period in Arkansas (1864–74), Brooks and the "Brindle Tails" faction of the state's Republican Party led a coalition group in an attempt to overthrow Republican governor Elisha Baxter. The Spring 1874 coup d'état attempt came to be known as the Brooks–Baxter War.

Early life and military service
Joseph Brooks was born in Cincinnati, Ohio, and worked as a minister, preacher, and Methodist church official in Illinois and Missouri from 1840 to 1862. He also worked as a newspaper editor for the Central Christian Advocate in St. Louis. In 1862, he joined the United States Volunteers as a chaplain. In 1863 Brooks, an ardent abolitionist since the 1850s, became chaplain of the 56th United States Colored Infantry. Brooks resigned from the U.S. Volunteers on February 1, 1865.

Reconstruction era
Brooks leased a cotton plantation near Helena, Arkansas, after the American Civil War. He helped organize freedmen and tried to recruit them to the Republican Party. He was a delegate to the Arkansas Constitutional Convention of 1868. During Reconstruction, Joseph Brooks was the leader of the "Brindle Tails" faction of the state's Republican Party. The faction was nicknamed "Brindle Tails", because it was said that when Brooks spoke he sounded like a Brindle-Tailed Bull. In the 1872 gubernatorial campaign, both Brooks and Baxter ran as Republicans.

In 1874, continued disputes about the validity of the 1872 election prompted the Brooks–Baxter War. Brooks put together a militia of more than six hundred men and took control of the state house in Little Rock. He declared himself governor. Baxter gathered about two thousand to fight the supporters of Brooks. Federal troops were stationed between the two forces, After an armed conflict and intervention from U.S. president Ulysses S. Grant, Brooks was removed from office. That same year, however, Grant appointed him as the  postmaster of Little Rock, Arkansas, a patronage position.

References

External links

 
 Joseph Brooks at The Political Graveyard
 
 

1821 births
1877 deaths
19th-century American clergy
19th-century American male writers
19th-century American newspaper editors
19th-century American politicians
American abolitionists
American male journalists
Methodists from Arkansas
Arkansas postmasters
Burials at Bellefontaine Cemetery
Deaths in Arkansas
DePauw University alumni
Editors of Arkansas newspapers
Internal Revenue Service people
Leaders who took power by coup
Republican Party members of the Arkansas House of Representatives
Methodist abolitionists
People of the Brooks–Baxter War
People of Missouri in the American Civil War
People from Cincinnati
Politicians from Little Rock, Arkansas
Union Army chaplains
Writers from St. Louis